Jess Søderberg (born 12 October 1944, in Copenhagen) is a Danish businessman. He served as the CEO of A.P. Moller-Maersk for 14 years from 1993 to 2007. After his departure from A.P. Moller-Maersk, he was Vice President of Carlsberg.

He graduated from Holte School in 1963 and later graduated with his MSc from Copenhagen Business School. He is a Knight 1st Class of the Order of Dannebrog.

References 

Jens Chr. Hansen & Søren Domino, Søderberg – Mand af Mærsk, Gyldendal, 2006. .
Thomas Larsen og Finn Mortensen, Mærsk Mc-Kinney Møller, Gyldendal Business, 2008

Living people
1944 births
Danish business executives
Copenhagen Business School alumni
Knights First Class of the Order of the Dannebrog